Verkade is the name of a Dutch patrician family originating from Maasland.

History
Founder of the family is Pieter Leendertsz. Verkade who died in 1657. He was a farmer in de Commandeurspolder. His descendants worked in the local administration of the region. One branch of the family became known for being manufacturers of chocolate, rusk and cookies, after, in 1886, Ericus Verkade founded the Koninklijke Verkade N.V. company in Zaandam.

Notable members
 Pieter Verkade (1767–1848), notary and mayor of Vlaardinger-ambacht en Zouteveen (now Vlaardingen)
 Ericus Gerhardus Verkade (1835–1907), founder of Verkade en Compagnie and owner of the bread-, cookies- and rusk bakery  'De Ruyter' in Zaandam. His five sons were:
 Ericus Gerhardus Verkade (1868–1927), managing director of NV Verkade's Fabriek and alderman of Zaandam
 Jan Verkade (1868–1946), painter, twin brother of Ericus Jr 
 Arnold Hendrik Verkade (1872–1952), managing director of NV Verkade's Fabriek
 Jacobus Verkade (1906–2008), grandson of Ericus Verkade, specialized in sales and marketing, son of Arnold
 Johan Anton Eduard Verkade (1875-19??), managing director of NV Verkade's Fabriek and chair of the Chamber of Commerce for Zaanland
 Eduard Rutger Verkade (1878–1961), actor, stage-director
 Iwan Verkade (1921–2002), diplomat and secretary-general of Foreign Affairs, son of Eduard
 Kees Verkade (1941-2020), sculptor

Literature
Nederland's Patriciaat 40 (1954), p. 373-383.

References

External links 
 Verkade.nl

Dutch patrician families
Dutch families
Dutch-language surnames